Shaab Jereh (also Romanized as Sha‘ab Jereh; also known as Shabjereh) is a village in Shaab Jereh Rural District, Toghrol Al Jerd District, Kuhbanan County, Kerman Province, Iran. At the 2006 census, its population was 1,689, in 437 families.

References 

Populated places in Kuhbanan County